New Century Forum is a pro-Beijing middle-class oriented political group in the Hong Kong Special Administrative Region of the People's Republic of China.  The group comprises professionals, businessmen and academics, and aims to represent the voice of the middle-class. It is currently led by convenor Ma Fung-kwok.

Platform
The basic platform of the group is to consolidate the power of the middle-class and to protect the long-term interest of Hong Kong. It aims to focus on studying various public policy issues and suggest proposals in a rational and professional manner, on the basis of the "One country-two systems" principle. On political development, it advocates development of a democratic political system in a step by step process. The party is relatively small and its platforms undeveloped.

History
The New Century Forum was formed by Ng Ching-fai, then member of the Legislative Council of Hong Kong and dean of the Hong Kong Baptist University. Ng resigned from the President of the Baptist University in 2001 and quit the New Century Forum. Ma Fung-kwok, the incumbent convenor, was elected into LegCo by the election committee in 2001, replacing the Ng Ching-fai. With the cancellation of the election committee seats in the 2004 elections, the group had no seat in the LegCo until convenor Ma Fung-kwok won a seat in the Sports, Performing Arts, Culture and Publication in 2012 LegCo election.

The group participated in the direct elections in the 2000 LegCo elections and the 2004 LegCo elections but did not win any seat. Members of the group also contested in the District Council elections but usually ran as independent candidates.

Election performances

Legislative Council elections

District Councils elections

See also
 United Front Work Department
 United Front (China)

External links
 Web site of the New Century Forum

1999 establishments in Hong Kong
Political organisations based in Hong Kong
Political organizations based in China
Non-profit organisations based in Hong Kong
Political and economic think tanks based in Hong Kong
Think tanks established in 1999
Conservative parties in Hong Kong